The Unit: Idol Rebooting Project is a South Korean reality television show.

Contestants
After the 4th episode was aired, I left the show due to health problems.

Age is shown according to Korean age system.

Color key

Unit B

Unit G

First Mission: The Music Video
After the Booting Evaluations, the contestants were tasked to form groups with nine members for the first mission. The winning team of each gender would become the center team in the music video of the show's theme song "My Turn".

Unit B Evaluations

Unit G Evaluations

Second Mission: Restart Mission
Contestants will choose one of the given songs of different concepts that they are confident in; new teams of nine are formed. Voting of each contestant is conducted during the performances. The winning team with the most votes will win a benefit of immunity from elimination in the first elimination round, regardless of overall vote rankings of the show, plus the chance to perform in Rain's comeback stage.

UNI+ G 
Color key

UNI+ B
Color key

Third Mission: Self-producing
Contestants will be grouped based on the following categories: Vocal, Rap-Vocal and Performance. All performances are self-arranged by the contestants themselves, with live band accompaniments for the Vocal and Rap-Vocal categories. The mission will be based on a rival match basis. Voting of each contestant is conducted during the performances. The top 3 members of the winning team for each category will win a benefit of immunity from elimination in the 2nd elimination round, regardless of overall vote rankings of the show.

UNI+ B
Color key

UNI+ G
Color key

Fourth Mission: Digital Singles Release
The 64 remaining contestants (32 from each gender) will form 5 groups for each gender, formed by the top 5 contestants from the Self-producing Mission. These formed groups will perform newly produced songs produced by reputable music producers, and these songs will be released as digital singles. Voting of each contestant is conducted during the performances. The winning team for each gender in this mission will have their songs' music videos directed by well-known directors Hong Won-ki and Lee Gi-taek. Plus, every contestant in the winning team will receive a benefit of additional online votes (1st placed contestant gets 10,000 additional votes, 2nd placed contestant gets 7,000 additional votes, and every other contestant in the team gets 5,000 additional votes), which can help in their final positions by the 3rd elimination round.

UNI+ B 
Color key

Bold denotes the person who picked the team members.

UNI+ G 
Color key

Bold denotes the person who picked the team members.

Final Mission: Final Stage Battle
The remaining contestants after the 3rd Voting Announcement will form 2 teams of 9 for each gender, through random picking of 1 of the 2 newly produced songs for each gender.

Uni+ G (Episode 14)

Uni+ B (Episode 14)

Notes

References 

Contestants
Lists of reality show participants
Lists of singers
Lists of dance musicians
Lists of pop musicians